Harpalus ochropus is a species of ground beetle in the subfamily Harpalinae. It was described by William Kirby in 1837.

References

ochropus
Beetles described in 1837